Ebrahim Al-Arrayedh (born 8 March 1908 – died May 2002) was a Bahraini writer and poet, generally considered to be one of Bahrain's greatest poets and one of the leaders of the Bahraini literary movement in the 20th century.

Biography
Al-Arrayedh was born in Bombay, India to Bahraini parents on 8 March 1908.  In 1922, he visited Bahrain for the first time at age 14, where he started his education at the country's first school, the Hidaya al-Khalifa school though he did not permanently reside in the island. His parents remain unknown. He returned to Bombay in 1926 and enrolled at a local school where he earned his high school diploma. It was at this school that Al-Arrayedh studied Persian and the English language, alongside Urdu, and had expressed a deep interest in Urdu literature. He later studied Urdu literature at the Aligarh Muslim University.

In 1927, Al-Arrayedh returned to Bahrain and was appointed as an English teacher in the Hidaya al-Khalifa school, a position he held for four years. He later became the deputy director of the Jafari school though he was forced to quit his job over disputes with the British colonial authorities. After this, he served as a treasurer in the State Customs Service. In 1937, he moved on to become the head of a translation department in a Bahraini company, which did not last as a result of the outbreak of World War II. In 1943, he traveled to Delhi and worked at a radio station. He later returned to Bahrain where he worked for the Bahrain Petroleum Company until 1967, when he retired.

Poetry
Since the age of 18, Al-Arrayedh began writing poetry, with his first set of poems being published in Baghdad in 1931. Since he was a multi-linguist, he translated the works of poets between Persian, Urdu, English, and Arabic. His poems were popular in Iraq, Syria and Egypt; such that the American University of Beirut asked him to deliver lectures on Arab literature, which he had agreed to. He was awarded the Shaikh Isa bin Salman Al Khalifa Order - First Class, by the Bahraini government.

He was also a noted reformer setting up a school, and was appointed head of the Constitutional Council by Sheikh Isa Bin Salman Al-Khalifa, who was responsible for developing Bahrain's Constitution in the early 1970s prior to independence from the United Kingdom.

Death
Al-Arrayedh died in May 2002 at the age of 94, after suffering breathing problems. He was buried in the "Manama Graveyard" next to his daughter the late Layla Al-Arrayedh who died in 2001 just before her father died.

Legacy
Following his death, the King Hamad bin Isa Al-Khalifa, named one of the Kingdom’s most geographically important roads after him — opposite the Bahrain Financial Harbour. In 2006, his old house, in Gudaibiya, in the capital city of Manama, was turned into a cultural centre, the Ebrahim Al-Arrayedh Poetry House, open to tourists and as a meeting place for poets.

In 2008, the United Nations Educational, Scientific and Cultural Organization held an exhibition in Al-Arrayedh's honour in its headquarters in Paris, France.

References

External links
Bibliography (in Arabic)

1908 births
2002 deaths
Writers from Mumbai
20th-century Bahraini poets
People from Manama
Bahraini expatriates in India
20th-century poets
Aligarh Muslim University alumni